The Alternative Informatics Association is an Istanbul-based civil society organization focusing on the issues of media literacy, Internet censorship, and mass surveillance.

The association organizes conferences, workshops, publishes e-books, as well as contributes to the organization of online and offline campaigns against internet censorship, mass surveillance. Members have also contributed to publications and activities concerning digital literacy and online games.

Activities 

Members of the association were part of the organization committee of Turkey's largest street protests against Internet censorship which took place in July 2010 in Istanbul and May 2011 with demonstrations in 30 cities.

In recent years the association has expanded its role in reporting breaches of digital rights in Turkey and demanding the protection of associated freedoms.
  
The Alternative Informatics Association organizes the annual New Media conference in Turkey which has brought together academics, activists and journalists to discuss threats against digital freedom.

History

Alternative Informatics Association gained its official status on December 31, 2010. However, the activities started online and offline before its inauguration.

2008
 November 2008: ozgurinternet.info established

2009
 June 7, 2009: Conference on the Internet Bans and Approaches to the Internet,  Baro Apaydın Saloon/İstanbul 
 November 21, 2009: Panel Discussion on "Hate Speech on New Media", Tarık Z. Tunaya K.M./İstanbul

2010
 March, 2010: Panel Discussion on "Hate Speech on New Media", Ankara University Communication Faculty Ankara
 April, 2010: A Workshop for Discussing the Internet BEKSAV /Ankara 
 June–July 2010: The Declaration of the Common Platform against the Censhorship, Taksim Protest March, Active participation in Turkish Grand Assembly Visits 
 July 1–4, 2010: Panel Discussion on Cultural Industries and Copy-Left European Social Forum, Istanbul 
 September 21–23, 2010: Participation in TBD (Informatics Association of Turkey) Informatics Convention/Ankara 
 September, 2010: Published book Hate Speech on the New Media- Collected Work, Kalkedon Publications
 December 2–4, 2010: Participation in I-net, ITU (Istanbul Technical university)/Istanbul
 December 31, 2010: Alternative Informatics Association gained its official status.

2011
 January 29, 2011 "Panel Discussion on WikiLeaks", EMO (Chamber of Energy Engineers)/Istanbul
 February 27, 2011 "Panel Discussion on Knowledge, Power, Internet Opposition", BİLMÖK (Congress of Computer Engineering Students), Yeditepe University
 March 16, 2011 "Panel Discussion on the Internet Bans", Yıldız Technical University, Computer Education Department, Istanbul
 March 24, 2011, Panel Discussion on Hate Speech on the New Media, Anadolu University, Eskişehir 
 April 16, 2011, Workshop on Hate Speech on the New Media, International Hate Speeches Conference, Lütfi Kırdar/İstanbul 
 April 28, 2011, Day for Tracking Hate Speeches on the New Media, Turkey
 May 6, 2011, Alternative Approach to ERP Processes, ERP Days Chamber of Architects and Engineers, ITU (İstanbul Technical University), Gümüşsuyu/Istanbul 
 May 10, 2011, Board for Information Technologies and Communication, Report against the Decision and Filter Application of the Board
 May 15, 2011, March Against the Internet Censorship called "Don’t Touch My Internet", Istanbul/Ankara
 May 21, 2011 "Social Media" Computer Education Department Congress, YTÜ/Istanbul
 May 25, 2011 "Participation in the Meeting of the Internet Board", Istanbul
 June 3, 2011, Panel Discussion: Internet Censorship in Turkey Boğaziçi Univ., İstanbul 
 June 4, 2011, Workshop on Moral Values on the New Media, Kadir Has University, Department of New Media, İstanbul 
 Bring the case on the prevention of the website "sites.google.com" to European Court of Human Rights,
 E-Book on Wikileaks and Arab Spring, titled Courageous New Media, April 2011
 E-book, Politics Of E-Participation: Young People Online, 
 September 12–13, UNICEF Workshop, Internet Usage of Youths and Children in Turkey, Ankara
 September 16, Seminars on Dijital Video Games, METU Ankara
 September 17, Internet Censorship, EMO Samsun,
 September 17, Forbidding Forbidden round table meeting, ISEA, Istanbul
 September 20, discussion P2P theory with Micahel Bauwens, Istanbul
 October 14–15, Workshop on Mapping with FreeSoftwares, OpenStreetMap, Istanbul
 October 16, Alternative Media Festival, Hate Speech, Digital Activism, Istanbul
 November 10, case against the Decision and Filter Application of the Board, Ankara
 November 18–20, LabourStart Int. Conference, Linux Workshop, Istanbul
 December 1–3, sessions on INET'11, Censorship, Law and Internet, Internet Media and DPI, İZMİR
 November 21–23, UNICEF Children Forum, Internet Usage of Youths and Children in Turkey, ANKARA
 December 4 and January 21, Meetings on Internet as a Human Right on New Constitution, collaborated with Friedrich-Ebert-Stiftung Turkei, ISTANBUL
 December 27, session on Chaos Communication Congress 28C3, Berlin

2012
 January 7, declaration, Academic Awareness and a Call to All University Rectorships Against The Deployment of ICTA's Filter
 January 2012, Participating on establishing of Turkey Digital Game Association
 February 18, Internet Blackout against SOPA
 March 2012, Seminar Digital Surveillance, Marmara Unv. 
 March 2012, initiating of Istanbul HackerSpace, Istanbul
 March 2012, Seminar "Suç altette mi?" on SOPA, PIPA, ACTA, etc., Bahçeşehir Unv., Istanbul
 March 2012, Workshop: "The Future of Pardus" (Linux Distro by TUBITAK), IZMIT
 March 2012, Workshop: Mind Map with VUE (visual understanding environment), Free Software Days Istanbul 
 April 9, Declaration of Internet Users' Rights 
 April 16, Statement about Internet in Turkey 
 May 20, Published Book: Digital Surveillance in Turkey: Digital Personification of Citizens in Turkey from ID Numbers to E- IDs
 June 16, Panel: "Digital Surveillance in Turkey"
 October 23, Panel: "Surveillance, Censorship and Data Protection in Turkey", ECREA Pre-Conference

2014 
 September 2014, Internet Ungovernance Forum at Bilgi University

2015 
 July 2015: Digital rights activist Isik Mater voted in as president of the association

2019 
 February 2015 Lawyer Faruk Çayır voted in as president of the association

See also

 Human Rights in Turkey

References

Internet censorship
Surveillance
Mass surveillance
Digital rights
Digital divide
Net neutrality
Access to Knowledge movement
Internet-related activism
Internet governance advocacy groups
Digital rights organizations
Internet privacy organizations
Freedom of expression organizations
Political advocacy groups in Turkey
Organizations based in Turkey
Human rights in Turkey
Politics of Turkey
Internet censorship in Turkey